The 2006 United States Senate election in Delaware was held November 7, 2006. Incumbent Democratic U.S. Senator Tom Carper won re-election to a second term, by a landslide 40 points.

Republican primary

Candidates 
 Christine O'Donnell, anti-abortion advocate (ran as a write-in candidate in general election)
 Mike Protack, commercial airline pilot
 Jan Ting, Temple University law professor

Results

General election

Candidates 
 Thomas R. Carper (D), incumbent U.S. Senator
 Jan C. Ting (R), law professor
 Bill Morris (L), activist
 Christine O'Donnell (Write-in), anti-abortion activist

Debates 
Complete video of debate, October 20, 2006

Predictions

Polling

Results

See also 
 2006 United States Senate elections

References 
Specific
 
 
   Topic: Primary results

General

External links 
Political position
 
  
 
 
 
 
 
 
 

Delaware
2006
2006 Delaware elections